PT Industri Kereta Api (Persero), abbreviated as INKA, is an Indonesian state owned rolling stock manufacturer.

Profile 

INKA Ltd was established in 1981 to serve as the national rail locomotive and rolling stock manufacturer for the Indonesian Railway Company (PT Kereta Api Indonesia (Persero)) in its revenue lines in the islands of Java and Sumatra. Its first Madiun Locomotive Plant was converted from a former PJKA steam locomotive overhaul facility. Under Suharto's presidency INKA was initiated as part of the national strategic industry, as the basis of a national rail production industry. As such, INKA focused on dominating the domestic market and to win competition in the ASEAN region and developing countries.

INKA has produced or refurbished every batch of KAI's passenger cars, excluding multiple units, since 1985. Its production of multiple units began in 1987, when it assembled Rheostatik EMUs from Japan. Since then, INKA utilises lightweight stainless steel car bodies and modern AC traction control with VVVF inverters (formerly GTO, now IGBT) for EMU production. INKA started producing diesel multiple units in 2007 with orders from Ministry of Transportation for regional and commuter trains. INKA has supplied various freight wagons to KAI, most notably the coal transport wagons supporting coal mining industry in Ombilin (West Sumatra) and South Sumatra.

In 2019 PT INKA (Persero) cooperated with PT Len Industri (Persero), PT Wijaya Karya (Persero) and PT Kereta Api Indonesia (Persero) to collaborate on business development by forming a consortium of Indonesian Railways Development Incorporated for Africa (IRDIA), targeting African countries.

In addition, INKA Ltd has, together with KAI, established cooperation with Swiss rolling stock manufacture, Stadler Rail established a joint venture to build a rolling stock factory that has specialized facilities for rolling stock crash test and tilt/roll-over test following the International Union of Railways (UIC) standards in Banyuwangi, East Java. This cooperation was intended to assist Indonesian government in developing Indonesian transportation system.

Products

Railway rolling stocks

INKA has been producing locomotives, trainsets, railcars and multiple units, some of which are made in cooperation with other companies. Some products have been exported to foreign countries. Some INKA rolling stock projects:

 1982 – Enclosed boxcar for PJKA
 1985 – 1985 batch PJKA Ekonomi passenger coaches
 1987 – Rheostatic ED101 EMU, 1987 batch (in cooperation with Japanese consortium led by Nippon Sharyo)
 1991 – Freight wagons for KTMB
 1994 – VVVF-GTO EA201 series EMU, in cooperation with BN-Holec
 1995 – Argo Bromo and Argo Gede class trainsets
 1996 – CC203 locomotive, in cooperation with GE
 1997 – Argo Bromo Anggrek trainsets
 1998 – Ballast Hopper wagon for SRT
 2001 – EA201 series EMU for KRL Jabotabek
 2002 – Power station wagon and reefer bogie flat car for KTMB
 2004 – Container wagon body & blizzard center sills (to Australia)
 2006 – Bangladesh Railway BG passenger coaches
 2007 – Kertalaya railbus for South Sumatra provincial government. 
 2008 – MH102 series (Kereta Rel Diesel Indonesia) (for Aceh and Java)
 2010 – batch Ekonomi AC trainsets for Kemenhub, GE C20EMP locomotives (in cooperation with GE Transportation)
 2011 – Batara Kresna Railbus and EA202 series EMU
 2016 – batch KAI executive and economy class coaches and Bangladesh Railway BG and MG coaches
 2018 – Third rail LRV for Palembang LRT An improved model was produced in 2019 for Greater Jakarta LRT. EA203 series EMU for Soekarno-Hatta airport rail link
 2019 – PNR 8000 class DMU
 2020 – PNR 8100 class DMU and INKA CC300 DHLs (plus 15 PNR 8300 class coaches) to the Philippines
 2023 - 133 flat wagons for KiwiRail in New Zealand

Automotive industry

In 2008, INKA proposed GEA (short for Gulirkan Energi Alternatif) as a national car. A prototype was created in 2008. In 2009, GEA began using the machinery developed by BPPT, Rusnas, after previously using Chinese machinery. Carburetors are the only imported component in the 2009 prototype.

PT Inka also supplied compressed natural gas-powered (CNG) buses for TransJakarta, mainly known as the name brand Inobus (abbreviated as Innovation Bus). Currently, there are three known product variants:
 Inobus ATC 320 (Articulated Car) (produced year 2011–2012) with Cummins Westport ISL-G 320 HP CNG engine, mated with Voith DIWA 864.3E automatic transmission.
39 units were operated in total, with 21 units operated by Perum DAMRI from 2011 to 2018 and 18 units operated by PT. Bianglala Metropolitan from 2013 to 2016. The main difference between the two is DAMRI operated units used Songz Air Conditioning whilst Bianglala operated units used Denso Air Conditioning.
 Inobus SGL 290 (Single) with Doosan GL11K 290 HP (EPA 2010) CNG Engine, the same engine used in current Zhongtong buses, mated with Allison Transmission T350R automatic. A total of 36 units, should have been operated by Perum PPD.
 Future fleet: Inobus ATC 340 (Articulated Car) with Doosan GL11K 340 HP Euro IV CNG Engine, the same engine used in current Zhongtong buses bus, mated with Voith DIWA 864.5 automatic transmission.
In 2011, INKA produced Kancil, a 404 cc vehicle planned to replace auto rickshaws. However, he could not develop in his market, because of the existing regulations at that time. That is, it can only replace the existing  auto rickshaws.

References

External links 
 
  Official site
  Official site

Companies based in Madiun
Government-owned companies of Indonesia
Locomotive manufacturers of Indonesia
Rolling stock manufacturers of Indonesia
Bus manufacturers of Indonesia
Manufacturing companies established in 1981